The Pulitzer Prize for Biography or Autobiography is one of the seven American Pulitzer Prizes that are annually awarded for Letters, Drama, and Music. It has been presented since 1917 for a distinguished biography, autobiography or memoir by an American author or co-authors, published during the preceding calendar year. Thus it is one of the original Pulitzers, for the program was inaugurated in 1917 with seven prizes, four of which were awarded that year.

Winners
In its first 97 years to 2013, the Biography Pulitzer was awarded 97 times. Two were given in 1938, none in 1962.

1910s
 1917: Julia Ward Howe by Laura E. Richards and Maud Howe Elliott, assisted by Florence Howe Hall
 1918: Benjamin Franklin, Self-Revealed by William Cabell Bruce
 1919: The Education of Henry Adams by Henry Adams

1920s
 1920: The Life of John Marshall, 4 vols. by Albert J. Beveridge
 1921: The Americanization of Edward Bok: The Autobiography of a Dutch Boy Fifty Years After by Edward Bok
 1922: A Daughter of the Middle Border by Hamlin Garland
 1923: The Life and Letters of Walter H. Page by Burton J. Hendrick
 1924: From Immigrant to Inventor by Michael I. Pupin
 1925: Barrett Wendell and His Letters by M. A. Dewolfe Howe
 1926: The Life of Sir William Osler, 2 vols. by Harvey Cushing
 1927: Whitman by Emory Holloway
 1928: The American Orchestra and Theodore Thomas by Charles Edward Russell
 1929: The Training of an American: The Earlier Life and Letters of Walter H. Page by Burton J. Hendrick

1930s
 1930: The Raven: A Biography of Sam Houston by Marquis James
 1931: Charles W. Eliot, President of Harvard University, 1869–1901 by Henry James
 1932: Theodore Roosevelt: A Biography by Henry F. Pringle
 1933: Grover Cleveland: A Study in Courage by Allan Nevins
 1934: John Hay by Tyler Dennett
 1935: R. E. Lee by Douglas S. Freeman
 1936: The Thought and Character of William James by Ralph Barton Perry
 1937: Hamilton Fish by Allan Nevins
 1938: Pedlar's Progress: The Life of Bronson Alcott by Odell Shepard
 1938: Andrew Jackson, 2 vols. by Marquis James
 1939: Benjamin Franklin by Carl Van Doren

1940s
 1940: Woodrow Wilson, Life and Letters. Vols. VII and VIII by Ray Stannard Baker
 1941: Jonathan Edwards, 1703–1758: a biography by Ola Elizabeth Winslow
 1942: Crusader in Crinoline: The Life of Harriet Beecher Stowe by Forrest Wilson
 1943: Admiral of the Ocean Sea by Samuel Eliot Morison
 1944: The American Leonardo: The Life of Samuel F. B. Morse by Carleton Mabee
 1945: George Bancroft: Brahmin Rebel by Russel Blaine Nye
 1946: Son of the Wilderness: The Life of John Muir by Linnie Marsh Wolfe
 1947: The Autobiography of William Allen White by William Allen White
 1948: Forgotten First Citizen: John Bigelow by Margaret Clapp
 1949: Roosevelt and Hopkins by Robert E. Sherwood

1950s
 1950: John Quincy Adams and the Foundations of American Foreign Policy by Samuel Flagg Bemis
 1951: John C. Calhoun: American Portrait by Margaret Louise Coit
 1952: Charles Evans Hughes by Merlo J. Pusey
 1953: Edmund Pendleton 1721–1803 by David J. Mays
 1954: The Spirit of St. Louis by Charles A. Lindbergh
 1955: The Taft Story by William S. White
 1956: Benjamin Henry Latrobe by Talbot Faulkner Hamlin
 1957: Profiles in Courage by John F. Kennedy
 1958: George Washington, Volumes I-VII by Douglas Southall Freeman with John Alexander Carroll and Mary Wells Ashworth
 1959: Woodrow Wilson, American Prophet by Arthur Walworth

1960s
 1960: John Paul Jones by Samuel Eliot Morison
 1961: Charles Sumner and the Coming of the Civil War by David Donald
 1962: no award given 
 1963: Henry James by Leon Edel
 1964: John Keats by Walter Jackson Bate
 1965: Henry Adams, 3 vols., by Ernest Samuels
 1966: A Thousand Days: John F. Kennedy in the White House by Arthur M. Schlesinger, Jr.
 1967: Mr. Clemens and Mark Twain by Justin Kaplan
 1968: Memoirs by George F. Kennan
 1969: The Man from New York: John Quinn and His Friends by Benjamin Lawrence Reid

1970s
 1970: Huey Long by Thomas Harry Williams
 1971: Robert Frost : The Years of Triumph, 1915–1938, by Lawrance Thompson
 1972: Eleanor and Franklin by Joseph P. Lash
 1973: Luce and His Empire by W. A. Swanberg
 1974: O'Neill, Son and Artist by Louis Sheaffer
 1975: The Power Broker: Robert Moses and the Fall of New York by Robert Caro
 1976: Edith Wharton: A Biography by R. W. B. Lewis
 1977: A Prince of Our Disorder: The Life of T. E. Lawrence by John E. Mack
 1978: Samuel Johnson by Walter Jackson Bate
 1979: Days of Sorrow and Pain: Leo Baeck and the Berlin Jews by Leonard Baker

1980s
Entries from this point on include the finalists listed after the winner for each year.
 1980: The Rise of Theodore Roosevelt by Edmund Morris
 Being Bernard Berenson by Meryle Secrest
 Bernard Berenson, The Making of a Connoisseur by Ernest Samuels
 The Duke of Deception by Geoffrey Wolff
 1981: Peter the Great: His Life and World by Robert K. Massie
 Walt Whitman: A Life by Justin Kaplan
 Walter Lippmann and the American Century by Ronald Steel
 1982: Grant: A Biography by William S. McFeely
 Mornings on Horseback by David McCullough
 Waldo Emerson by Gay Wilson Allen
 1983: Growing Up by Russell Baker
 Churchill: Young Man in a Hurry, 1874–1915 by Ted Morgan
 Thomas E. Dewey and His Times by Richard Norton Smith
 1984: Booker T. Washington: The Wizard of Tuskegee, 1901–1915 by Louis R. Harlan
 Black Apollo of Science: The Life of Ernest Everett Just by Kenneth Manning
 Thomas Carlyle: A Biography by Fred Kaplan
 1985: The Life and Times of Cotton Mather by Kenneth Silverman
 Becoming William James by Howard M. Feinstein
 The Seven Mountains of Thomas Merton by Michael Mott
 1986: Louise Bogan: A Portrait by Elizabeth Frank
 A Hidden Childhood: A Jewish Girl's Sanctuary in a French Convent, 1942–1945 by Frida Scheps Weinstein
 George Washington Williams: A Biography by John Hope Franklin
 1987: Bearing the Cross: Martin Luther King Jr. and the Southern Christian Leadership Conference by David J. Garrow
 Dostoevsky: The Stir of Liberation, 1860–1865 by Joseph Frank
 Murrow: His Life and Times by A.M. Sperber
 The Life and Times of Congressman John Quincy Adams by Leonard L. Richards
 1988: Look Homeward: A Life of Thomas Wolfe by David Herbert Donald
 George Santayana: A Biography by John Owen McCormick
 Hemingway by Kenneth S. Lynn
 1989: Oscar Wilde by Richard Ellmann
 A Bright Shining Lie: John Paul Vann and America in Vietnam by Neil Sheehan
 Freud: A Life for Our Time by Peter Gay
 The Life of Langston Hughes: Volume II, 1941–1967: I Dream a World by Arnold Rampersad

1990s
 1990: Machiavelli in Hell by Sebastian de Grazia
 A First-Class Temperament: The Emergence of Franklin Roosevelt by Geoffrey C. Ward
 Clear Pictures: First Loves, First Guides by Reynolds Price
 The Road from Coorain by Jill Ker Conway
 1991: Jackson Pollock: An American Saga by Steven Naifeh and Gregory White Smith
 Alfred I. Du Pont: The Man and His Family by Joseph Frazier Wall
 The Five of Hearts: An Intimate Portrait of Henry Adams and His Friends 1880–1918 by Patricia O'Toole
 1992: Fortunate Son: The Autobiography of Lewis B. Puller Jr. by Lewis B. Puller
 Frederick Douglass by William S. McFeely
 Orwell: The Authorized Biography by Michael Shelden
 1993: Truman by David McCullough
 Genius: The Life and Science of Richard Feynman by James Gleick
 Kissinger: A Biography by Walter Isaacson
 1994: W. E. B. Du Bois: Biography of a Race, 1868–1919 by David Levering Lewis
 Genet: A Biography by Edmund White
 In Extremis: The Life of Laura Riding by Deborah Baker
 1995: Harriet Beecher Stowe: A Life by Joan D. Hedrick
 Hugo Black: A Biography by Roger K. Newman
 Saint-Exupery: A Biography by Stacy Schiff
 1996: God: A Biography by Jack Miles
 John Sloan: Painter and Rebel by John Loughery
 Mozart: A Life by Maynard Solomon
 1997: Angela's Ashes: A Memoir by Frank McCourt
 Herman Melville: A Biography, Volume 1, 1819–1851 by Hershel Parker
 In the Wilderness: Coming of Age in Unknown Country by Kim Barnes
 1998: Personal History by Katharine Graham
 Alfred C. Kinsey: A Public-Private Life by James H. Jones
 Whittaker Chambers: A Biography by Sam Tanenhaus
 1999: Lindbergh by A. Scott Berg
 A Beautiful Mind by Sylvia Nasar
 At Home with the Marquis de Sade: A Life by Francine du Plessix Gray

2000s
 2000: Vera, Mrs. Vladimir Nabokov by Stacy Schiff
 Clear Springs: A Memoir by Bobbie Ann Mason
 Galileo's Daughter: A Historical Memoir of Science, Faith, and Love by Dava Sobel
 2001: W. E. B. Du Bois: The Fight for Equality and the American Century 1919-1963 by David Levering Lewis
 Johann Sebastian Bach: The Learned Musician by Christoph Wolff
 The First American: The Life and Times of Benjamin Franklin by H.W. Brands
 2002: John Adams. by David McCullough
 An Hour Before Daylight: Memories of a Rural Boyhood by Jimmy Carter
 Grant by Jean Edward Smith
 2003: Master of the Senate: The Years of Lyndon Johnson by Robert Caro
 Beethoven: The Music and the Life by Lewis Lockwood
 The Fly Swatter by Nicholas Dawidoff
 2004: Khrushchev: The Man and His Era by William Taubman
 Arshile Gorky: His Life and Work by Hayden Herrera
 Isaac Newton by James Gleick
 2005: de Kooning: An American Master by Mark Stevens and Annalyn Swan
 Under a Wild Sky: John James Audubon and the Making of The Birds of America by William Souder
 Will in the World: How Shakespeare Became Shakespeare by Stephen Greenblatt
 2006: American Prometheus: The Triumph and Tragedy of J. Robert Oppenheimer by Kai Bird and Martin J. Sherwin
 The Peabody Sisters: Three Women Who Ignited American Romanticism by Megan Marshall
 The Year of Magical Thinking by Joan Didion
 2007: The Most Famous Man in America: The Biography of Henry Ward Beecher by Debby Applegate
 Andrew Carnegie by David Nasaw
 John Wilkes: The Scandalous Father of Civil Liberty by Arthur H. Cash
 2008: Eden's Outcasts: The Story of Louisa May Alcott and Her Father by John Matteson
 The Life of Kingsley Amis by Zachary Leader
 The Worlds of Lincoln Kirstein by Martin Duberman
 2009: American Lion: Andrew Jackson in the White House by Jon Meacham
 The Bin Ladens: An Arabian Family in the American Century by Steve Coll
 Traitor to His Class: The Privileged Life and Radical Presidency of Franklin Delano Roosevelt by H.W. Brands

2010s
 2010: The First Tycoon: The Epic Life of Cornelius Vanderbilt by T.J. Stiles
 Cheever: A Life by Blake Bailey
 Woodrow Wilson: A Biography by John Milton Cooper, Jr.
 2011: Washington: A Life by Ron Chernow
 Mrs. Adams in Winter: A Journey in the Last Days of Napoleon by Michael O'Brien
 The Publisher: Henry Luce and His American Century by Alan Brinkley
 2012: George F. Kennan: An American Life by John Lewis Gaddis
 Malcolm X: A Life of Reinvention by Manning Marable
 Love and Capital: Karl and Jenny Marx and the Birth of a Revolution by Mary Gabriel
 2013: The Black Count: Glory, Revolution, Betrayal, and the Real Count of Monte Cristo by Tom Reiss
 Portrait of a Novel: Henry James and the Making of an American Masterpiece by Michael Gorra
 The Patriarch: The Remarkable Life and Turbulent Times of Joseph P. Kennedy by David Nasaw
 2014: Margaret Fuller: A New American Life by Megan Marshall
 Jonathan Swift: His Life and His World by Leo Damrosch
 Karl Marx: A Nineteenth-Century Life by Jonathan Sperber
 2015: The Pope and Mussolini: The Secret History of Pius XI and the Rise of Fascism in Europe by David I. Kertzer Louis Armstrong: Master of Modernism by Thomas Brothers
 Stalin: Volume I: Paradoxes of Power, 1878–1928 by Stephen Kotkin
 2016: Barbarian Days: A Surfing Life by William Finnegan
 Custer's Trials: A Life on the Frontier of a New America by T.J. Stiles
 The Light of the World: A Memoir by Elizabeth Alexander
 2017: The Return: Fathers, Sons and the Land in Between by Hisham Matar
 In the Darkroom by Susan Faludi
 When Breath Becomes Air by Paul Kalanithi
 2018: Prairie Fires: The American Dreams of Laura Ingalls Wilder by Caroline Fraser
 Richard Nixon: The Life by John A. Farrell
 Robert Lowell, Setting the River on Fire: A Study of Genius, Mania, and Character by Kay Redfield Jamison
 2019:' The New Negro: The Life of Alain Locke by Jeffrey C. Stewart
 Proust's Duchess: How Three Celebrated Women Captured the Imagination of Fin-de-Siècle Paris by Caroline Weber
 The Road Not Taken: Edward Lansdale and the American Tragedy in Vietnam by Max Boot

2020s

Repeat winners

Ten people have won the Pulitzer for Biography or Autobiography twice: 
 Burton J. Hendrick, 1923, 1929
 Allan Nevins, 1933, 1937
 Marquis James, 1930, 1938
 Douglas S. Freeman, 1935, 1958
 Samuel Eliot Morison, 1943, 1960
 Walter Jackson Bate, 1964, 1978
 David Herbert Donald, 1961, 1988
 David Levering Lewis, 1994, 2001
 David McCullough, 1993, 2002
 Robert Caro, 1975, 2003

W. A. Swanberg was selected by the Pulitzer board in 1962 and 1973; however, the trustees of Columbia University (then responsible for conferral of the awards) overturned the proposed 1962 prize for Citizen Hearst''.

See also

 Pulitzer Prize for History

References

External links
 

Biography
Biography awards
Awards established in 1917